Christopher Paul Keating (born October 12, 1957) is a former American football linebacker in the National Football League for the Buffalo Bills and the Washington Redskins.  He played college football at the University of Maine.

Chris has worked in the investment management industry since retiring from football and currently works for Mountain Pacific Group, Bellevue, WA.

1957 births
Living people
American football linebackers
Buffalo Bills players
Washington Redskins players
Archbishop Williams High School alumni